The CONCACAF–OFC play-off for the 1996 Summer Olympics was a men's under-23 international football play-off between a team from CONCACAF (North, Central America and Caribbean) and a team from OFC (Oceania), with the winner qualifying for the final berth in the Men's Football Tournament at the 1996 Summer Olympics.

Australia qualified to the Olympics with a 7–2 aggregate win over Canada, after a 2–2 draw in the first leg and a 5–0 win in the second leg.

Qualified teams

Matches

First leg

Second leg

Goalscorers

References

External links
 First leg report at 11v11.com
 Second leg report at 11v11.com
 Australia Under 23 National Team – 1996 Match Results at OZFootball.net
 Canada v Australia match reports at OZFootball.net

Football qualification for the 1996 Summer Olympics